Booming Back at You is the fifth studio album by Dutch electronic musician, remixer and producer Tom Holkenborg, better known as Junkie XL. It was released on 11 March 2008 by Artwerk, the joint venture of video game developer Electronic Arts and music company Nettwerk. The album was moderately successful in the charts, reaching number eleven in the Billboard Top Electronic Albums and becoming Junkie's first album to chart in the United States. The song "More" has been featured in the soundtrack of video game Need for Speed: ProStreet, "Mad Pursuit" was featured in the film 21  and the video game UEFA Euro 2008, and "Cities in Dust" was featured in the episode "Woman On the Verge" of the television series Gossip Girl and the video game Burnout Paradise.

Release 
After the release of his previous album Today, Junkie XL announced that he was no longer signed to the record label Roadrunner Records, and that all future albums would be self-released. However, by March 2007 video game developer Electronic Arts and music company Nettwerk announced their new joint venture, the record label Artwerk, to which they had already signed Junkie as their "flagship artist". Junkie had previously appeared on several EA game soundtracks, and even produced the soundtrack to Forza Motorsport, making him an ideal candidate. Artwerk announced their first studio album release with Junkie, Booming Back at You, in December. The title "Booming Back at You" was inspired by Junkie's fellow producers, Freq Nasty and Yonderboi. They also confirmed the album's first single "More", which was already available for download from various retailers and had been featured in the soundtrack of Need for Speed: ProStreet. The song Mad Pursuit, which features Electrocute, was featured on the soundtrack of the EA Sports game, UEFA Euro 2008 and FIFA 09. The album itself was released on 11 March 2008 in the Netherlands and the United States.

Critical reception 

Booming Back at You has received mixed, but generally positive reviews from a wide range of professional music critics. David Jeffries, a reviewer for Allmusic, described the album as "reliable and unoriginal", and said that it was "...not enough to raise him above 'the guy who remixed Elvis' and no great disappointment either". More favourably, Billboard writer Kerri Mason praised Junkie XL for creating "a fully realized, addictive long-player", and related some songs on the album to British electronic duo Goldfrapp. Music magazine Q said that some of the songs had "a slightly dated stadium-house feel", but conceded that "when [Junkie] thrills, he truly thrills".

Chart performance 
Booming Back at You enjoyed some moderate success in the 2008 album charts. On 22 March it debuted in the Dutch Album Chart, peaking at number 59 and remaining in the chart for three weeks. It then entered the Billboard Top Electronic Albums chart at number eleven on 29 March, becoming the first album by Junkie XL to chart in the United States.

Track listing

Personnel 
The following people contributed to Booming Back at You.

 Tom Holkenborg – writing, production, performance, arrangement, mixing, mastering
 Andre Ettema – writing, sound design
 Steve Aoki – writing, production, 
 Lucas Banker – writing, production
 Budgie – writing
 Sam Estes – sound design
 Olaf Heine – photography
 Bram Inscore – 

 Nicole Morier – 
 Lauren Rocket – 
 Sargent 666 –  
 Steven Severin – writing
 Siouxsie Sioux – writing
 Tommy Vext – 
 Willoughby – 
 Toshi Yanagi –

References

External links 
 Aggregate review at Metacritic
 Booming Back at You at Discogs
 Booming Back at You at MusicBrainz

2008 albums
Junkie XL albums